Jhanjharpur Lok Sabha constituency is one of the 40 Lok Sabha (parliamentary) constituencies in Bihar state in eastern India.

Assembly segments
From the 2009 Lok Sabha elections, Jhanjharpur Lok Sabha constituency comprises the following six Vidhan Sabha (legislative assembly) segments:

Members of Parliament

Election results

2019

2014

See also
 Madhubani district
 List of Constituencies of the Lok Sabha

References

Lok Sabha constituencies in Bihar
Politics of Madhubani district